Daniel Eduardo Moreira Silva (born 8 June 1985) is a Portuguese cyclist, who most recently rode for UCI Continental team .

Major results
2009
 1st Overall GP Liberty Seguros
2011
 10th Overall Volta a Portugal
2012
 4th Overall Vuelta a Guatemala
 4th Overall Volta a Portugal
2013
 1st Stage 1 Volta ao Alentejo
 6th Overall Volta a Portugal
2015
 8th Overall Volta a Portugal
2016
 3rd Overall Volta a Portugal

References

External links

1985 births
Living people
Portuguese male cyclists
Place of birth missing (living people)